Dasyomma is a genus of flies in the family Athericidae.

Species
Dasyomma fulvum (Philippi, 1865)
Dasyomma poecilogaster (Philippi, 1865)
Dasyomma cinerascens (Philippi, 1865)
Dasyomma abdominale Hardy, 1933
Dasyomma atratulum Malloch, 1932
Dasyomma atribasis Malloch, 1932
Dasyomma atritarsis Malloch, 1932
Dasyomma basale Malloch, 1932
Dasyomma caerulea Macquart, 1840
Dasyomma chapelco Coscarón, 1995
Dasyomma chrysopilum Woodley, 2007
Dasyomma coeruleum var. impressifrons Malloch, 1932
Dasyomma croceicornis Bigot, 1887
Dasyomma dissimile Hardy, 1920
Dasyomma flavum Hardy, 1933
Dasyomma gonzalezi Coscarón, 1995
Dasyomma hardyi Paramonov, 1962
Dasyomma herbsti Edwards, 1934
Dasyomma hirticeps Malloch, 1932
Dasyomma humerale Malloch, 1932
Dasyomma hydrophilum Paramonov, 1962
Dasyomma immaculatum Malloch, 1932
Dasyomma infernale Paramonov, 1962
Dasyomma maculipenne Hardy, 1920
Dasyomma malleco Coscarón, 1995
Dasyomma mcalpinei Paramonov, 1962
Dasyomma norrisi Paramonov, 1962
Dasyomma tasmanicum Paramonov, 1962
Dasyomma tonnoiri Paramonov, 1962
Dasyomma trianguliferous Coscarón, 1995
Dasyomma trivittatum Malloch, 1932
Dasyomma univittatum Malloch, 1932
Dasyomma vittatum Malloch, 1932
Dasyomma wirthi Coscarón, 1995

References

Athericidae
Brachycera genera
Diptera of South America
Diptera of Australasia
Taxa named by Pierre-Justin-Marie Macquart